Ryan Pearson may refer to:

 Ryan Pearson (footballer) (born 1989), Australian footballer
 Ryan W. Pearson (born 1988), American politician in the Rhode Island Senate
 Ryan Pearson (basketball) (born 1990), American basketball player